The Lafayette–Opelousas–Morgan City combined statistical area is made up of seven parishes in the Acadiana region of southern Louisiana. The statistical area consists of the Lafayette Metropolitan Statistical Area (MSA) and two micropolitical statistical areas (μSAs) – Opelousas, Louisiana Micropolitical Statistical Area and Morgan City, Louisiana Micropolitical Statistical Area. The region consists of seven parishes: Acadia, Iberia, Lafayette, St. Landry, St. Martin, St. Mary, and Vermilion Parishes. As of the 2010 census, the CSA had a population of 604,784 (though a 2015 estimate placed the population at 627,146).

The CSA is home to a large Cajun population and is also known as the "Cajun heartland".

Demographics
As of the census of 2010, there were 550,134 people, 188,219 households, and 134,322 families residing within the CSA. The racial makeup of the CSA was 70.42% White, 27.07% African American, 0.25% Native American, 1.01% Asian, 0.02% Pacific Islander, 0.40% from other races, and 0.84% from two or more races. Hispanic or Latino of any race were 1.35% of the population. Of the total population over the age of 5, 83.4% (419,800) spoke English and 12.7% (64,001) spoke French (including Cajun French and Louisiana Creole French).

The median income for a household in the CSA was $29,577, and the median income for a family was $35,717. Males had a median income of $31,564 versus $18,942 for females. The per capita income for the CSA was $14,467.

Communities

Places with 20,000 people or more
Lafayette (principal city)
New Iberia
Opelousas

Places with 10,000 to 19,999 people
Abbeville
Eunice
Crowley
Morgan City

Places with 2,500 to 9,999 people

Bayou Vista
Berwick
Breaux Bridge
Broussard
Butte La Rose
Carencro
Church Point
Franklin
Jeanerette
Kaplan
Patterson
Rayne
Scott
St. Martinville
Youngsville

Places with fewer than 2,500 people

Amelia
Arnaudville
Baldwin
Basile (mostly located in Evangeline Parish with small southern portion located in Acadia Parish)
Branch
Cade
Cankton
Cecilia
Centerville
Charenton
Delcambre
Duson
Erath
Estherwood
Glencoe
Grand Coteau
Gueydan
Henderson
Iota
Krotz Springs
Leonville
Loreauville
Lydia
Maurice
Melville
Mermentau
Milton
Morse
Palmetto
Parks
Port Barre
Sunset
Washington

See also
Louisiana census statistical areas
List of cities, towns, and villages in Louisiana
List of census-designated places in Louisiana

References

Geography of Acadia Parish, Louisiana
Geography of Iberia Parish, Louisiana
Geography of Lafayette Parish, Louisiana
Geography of St. Landry Parish, Louisiana
Geography of St. Martin Parish, Louisiana
Geography of St. Mary Parish, Louisiana
Geography of Vermilion Parish, Louisiana
Acadiana
Combined statistical areas of the United States